Deoxyribonuclease gamma is an enzyme that in humans is encoded by the DNASE1L3 gene.

This gene encodes a member of the DNase family. The protein hydrolyzes DNA, is not inhibited by actin, and mediates the breakdown of DNA during apoptosis. Alternate transcriptional splice variants of this gene have been observed but have not been thoroughly characterized.

Homozygosity for a null allele results in systemic lupus erythematosus. A loss of function allele in DNASE1L3 is associated with rheumatoid arthritis.

References

Further reading